This is a list of lighthouses in Kazakhstan faced on the Caspian Sea.

Lighthouses

See also
 Lists of lighthouses and lightvessels

References

External links

 

Kazakhstan
Lighthouses
Lighthouses